Eugenio Fernández may refer to:
Eugenio Fernández Granell, a Spanish surrealist painter
Eugenio Fernández Cerra (born 1920), Puerto Rican politician